Cirrhochrista cyclophora is a moth in the family Crambidae. It was described by Oswald Bertram Lower in 1903 and it is found in Australia.

References

Moths described in 1903
Spilomelinae
Moths of Australia